Thomas Whistler Smith,  (26 September 1824 – 11 December 1859) was an Australian businessman, banker and politician. He was a member of the New South Wales Legislative Assembly from 1857 until his early death in 1859 at the age of 35. He was the deputy chairman and managing director of the Commercial Banking Company of Sydney (now National Australia Bank), having been made one of its directors in 1850.

His sister Henrietta Octavia Lamb (née Smith) married into the Lamb banking family by wedding John de Villiers Lamb, a fellow director of the CBCS. John was the son of Commander John Lamb, who was also a Commercial Banking Company of Sydney director, as were his brothers Walter Lamb, Edward Lamb and Alfred Lamb. His sister-in-law via Walter was Margaret Dangar, daughter of Australian politician and explorer Henry Dangar.

Early life
Smith was born in London, England and was the son of Thomas Smith, a businessman known for the Smith Bros importing company he and his brothers Eustace Smith and Henry Smith founded. His uncle Henry Smith was a politician and banker who also served as a director of the Commercial Banking Company of Sydney. At age 6, Smith emigrated with his family to Sydney. After an elementary education, he joined his father's import and mercantile business.

Career

Smith was made a director of the Commercial Banking Company of Sydney in 1850, before departing for other directorships in 1851. He was a founder of the Sydney Exchange Co. and at 27 the youngest man to be elected to its board of directors, of which he was deputy chairman for some time. He was a director of the Commercial Banking Co. of Sydney, the Australian Gaslight Co., the Australian Trust Co., the Australian General Assurance Co., the Australian Steam Navigation Co.

In 1857, he returned as a director of the Commercial Banking Company of Sydney, where he was made deputy chairman and managing director. He resigned his other directorships in 1859 and was sent to the United Kingdom to establish the Commercial Banking Company of Sydney's first London office. However, shortly after his arrival in London he developed diphtheria and died at the age of 35.

Parliament
In 1857, Smith was elected as the member for Cumberland (North Riding) in the New South Wales Legislative Assembly. He won the seat at a by-election caused by the resignation of John Darvall who had become disenchanted with some of the more liberal features of the colonial constitution. He was re-elected at the 1858 election but resigned before the next election to take up his position in London. He did not hold a ministerial or parliamentary position.

References

 

1824 births
1859 deaths
Members of the New South Wales Legislative Assembly
People from Hornsey
19th-century Australian politicians